2008 S.League is the 13th season of Singapore's professional football league. It was won by Singapore Armed Forces, which was their seventh league title.

League table

Teams

The league play all its Friday matches, which is televised live on MediaCorp Channel 5 at the Jalan Besar Stadium.

Foreign players
Each club is allowed to have up to a maximum of 4 foreign players.

 Albirex Niigata (S), Dalian Shide and Super Reds are not allowed to hire any foreigners.

Leading goalscorers

S-League Awards Night Winners

Player of the Year
Aleksandar Duric - Singapore Armed Forces

Young Player of the Year
Khairul Amri - Tampines Rovers

Coach of the Year
  Hiroaki Hiraoka -  Albirex Niigata (S)

Top Scorer Award
Aleksandar Duric - Singapore Armed Forces

Fair Play Award
 Super Reds

Referee of the Year
T Aravinthan

Assistant Referee of the Year
Jeffrey Goh Gek Pheng

Goal of the Year
Abdelhadi Laakkad - Woodlands Wellington - (vs Young Lions on 23 February @ Woodlands Stadium)

Fan Club of the Year
Singapore Armed Forces

Story of the Year
Shamir Osman - Today - "No Panic As Dark Clouds Loom"

Picture of the Year
Koh Mui Fong - Today - "Super Reds Flying High"

People's Choice Award
 Kengne Ludovick - Home United

100 S.League Goals
 Park Tae Won - Woodlands Wellington

Notes and references

External links
 S.League 2008

Singapore Premier League seasons
1
Sing
Sing